Alfred Waterman (13 May 1911 – 27 March 1996) was an English cricketer. He played for Essex between 1937 and 1938.

References

External links

1911 births
1996 deaths
English cricketers
Essex cricketers
People from Walthamstow